Vice-Admiral Sir William Gonson 
(1482–1544), was a Naval Judge and Naval Administrator of the English Royal Navy who served under King Henry VIII.

Biography

Career
During the Tudor Period William Gonson's early career was as a private Merchant and Shipbuilder in the Royal Dockyards before he began his naval career. He was given command of Mary Grace in April 1513 as captain. In 1523 he was appointed Clerk of Marine Causes until 1533. In 1524 he was also appointed Paymaster or Treasurer of the Navy until 1544  William was a naval administrator of the English navy for over twenty years, he also held the title of Keeper of the Storehouses at Erith Dockyard and Deptford Dockyard from 1524 to 1537 in effect he held the posts of three of the later principal officers of the Council of the Marine. He was appointed by Henry VIII as Vice-Admiral of Norfolk and Suffolk in 1536. William eventually fell from grace and committed suicide in 1544  leaving the navy disorganized. It took two years for Henry to reorganize control and develop what became later known as 'The Navy Board'. He was probably along with William of Wrotham, and Sir Robert de Crull one of the three most important administrators of naval affairs of the English Navy prior to 1546.

Personal
William Gonson was born in Melton Mowbray, Leicestershire in England he was the son of Christopher Gonson and Elizabeth Gonson (née: Trussell), and brother of Bartholomew Gonson. He married Bennett Walters and together they had six sons Anthony, Arthur, Benjamin, Christopher, David and Richard. They also had four daughters Avis, Elizabeth, Margaret and Thomasine.

His son Benjamin Gonson, who would go on to hold a career in the English navy and also became  Treasurer of the Navy

His son Sir David Gonson was a Knight of Malta. He was imprisoned in the Tower of London in 1540 and was condemned to death by an Act of Parliament in 1541 for denying the authority of the King in spiritual matters and refusing to recant his Catholic faith. He was hanged, drawn and quartered at St. Thomas' Waterings, Southwark on 12 July 1541. Pope Pius XI declared him Blessed on 15 December 1929.

References
Citations

Sources

Brewer, J. S. (2015). Letters and Papers, Foreign and Domestic, of the Reign of Henry VIII. Cambridge University Press. .
Childs, David (2009). Tudor Sea Power: The Foundation of Greatness. Barnsley, UK: Seaforth Publishing. .
Loades, David (2011). Henry VIII. Amberley Publishing Limited. .
Williamson, James A. (1965). The Age of Drake. London: A & C Black Publishers Ltd. .

1482 births
1544 deaths
English admirals
16th-century Royal Navy personnel
English civil servants
Burials at St Dunstan-in-the-East
People of the Tudor period
People from Melton Mowbray
Suicides in the City of London